Trachemys dorbigni brasiliensis, the northern D'Orbigny's slider, is a subspecies of D'Orbigny's slider from Brazil, though validity of this subspecies is disputed.  It belongs to the same genus as the pond slider.

References

dorbigni brasiliensis
Turtles of South America
Endemic fauna of Brazil
Reptiles of Brazil